Labro is a  (municipality) in the Province of Rieti in the Italian region of Latium, located about  northeast of Rome and about  northwest of Rieti. It is a touristic destination and has been awarded with the orange flag.

Labro borders the following municipalities: Arrone, Colli sul Velino, Morro Reatino, Terni.

History 

Labro was founded between the 9th and 10th century; the first lord of Labro was sworn by Otto I in the year 956. During the middle ages, Labro was a possession of the city of Rieti and served as a stronghold to secure the border with the city of Spoleto. For this reason, Labro was involved in a number of battles, in particular with the bordering castle of Luco which was controlled by Spoleto.

After the Second World War, Labro suffered a strong depopulation, which endangered the very survival of the town. To fight the phenomenon and encourage tourism, starting from 1968, the heirs of the Nobili family decided to fully restore all the buildings in the village; the task was carried on by Flemish architect Ivan Van Mossevelde.

Main sights 
Labro hosts the 16th century Nobili-Vitelleschi castle.

Among the churches in town is the parish church of Santa Maria Maggiore.

There is an ex-Francescan monastery located in Labro that is run by the Colle di Costa hotel. From April 2010 to August 2013, the hotel shared the space with the Art Monastery Project, an international arts production organization that animated the town with regular performances and exhibitions.

Demographic evolution

Transport
Labro has a station on the Terni–Sulmona railway, with trains to Terni, Rieti and L'Aquila.

References

External links
 Thayer's Gazetteer (collecting the other sites as well)
 Art Monastery Project
Labro Astrotourism Travels

Cities and towns in Lazio